Blink was one of the largest online community in Norway with over 350,000 active members (7.74% of the Norwegian population). It was created by Fredrik Kristiansen and Morten Mitch Larød, and released on February 1, 2002. Over the following two years, the community became twice as popular as any other Norwegian community. The community was finally closed down at the end of 2011, due to a mass flight of users to competitors like Facebook. After this flight, the 4,000 active members were not enough for the community to remain viable and it was therefore closed down.

External links
Dagbladet.no Blink

Norwegian social networking websites